Richie Sagrado (born 30 January 2004) is a Belgian professional footballer who plays for OH Leuven in the Belgian Pro League. Sagrado made his debut for OH Leuven on 10 March 2023 when he was subbed on for Musa Al-Taamari with about 20 minutes to play in an away match against Charleroi.

References 

2004 births
Living people
Belgian footballers
Association football defenders
Oud-Heverlee Leuven players
Belgian Pro League players